Sylvia J. Luke (born December 15, 1967) is a Korean-American attorney and politician who served as a member of the Hawaii House of Representatives for the 25th district from 2013 until her election as lieutenant governor of Hawaii. She is serving as the 16th lieutenant governor of Hawaii, since December 2022. She is the first Korean American politician ever elected to a statewide office in the United States.

Early life and education
She was born on December 15, 1967, in Seoul, South Korea and later attended Lincoln Elementary School, Kawananakoa Middle School and graduated from Roosevelt High School in 1985.

Luke earned a Bachelor of Arts degree from the University of Hawaiʻi at Mānoa and a Juris Doctor from the University of San Francisco School of Law.

Career
In addition to serving as a legislator, she worked as an attorney in private practice. Luke consecutively served from January 1999 until 2013 in the Hawaii House of Representatives for the 26th district, and from January 2013 until 2022 for the 25th district.

Personal life
She is married to Michael Luke and has one son.

Elections
1998 When Republican Representative Quentin Kawānanakoa retired and left the District 26 seat open, Luke won the three-way September 19, 1998 Democratic Primary with 1,476 votes (44.9%), and won the November 3, 1998 General election with 4,914 votes (54.4%) against Republican nominee Christopher Dawson.
2000 Luke was unopposed for the September 23, 2000 Democratic Primary, winning with 3,400 votes, and won the November 5, 2002 General election with 4,344 votes (54.4%) against Republican nominee David Pang.
2002 Luke was unopposed for the September 21, 2002 Democratic Primary, winning with 3,474 votes, and won the November 5, 2002 General election with 5,317 votes (57.3%) against Republican nominee Signe Godfrey. who had been redistricted from District 6.
2004 Luke was unopposed for the September 18, 2004 Democratic Primary, winning with 3,520 votes, and won the November 2, 2004 General election with 6,245 votes (62.5%) against Republican nominee Bob Tom.
2006 Luke and Tom were both unopposed for their September 26, 2006 primaries, setting up a rematch; Luke won the November 7, 2006 General election with 4,918 votes (60.1%) against Tom.
2008 Luke was unopposed for the September 20, 2008 Democratic Primary, winning with 3,550 votes, and was unopposed for the November 4, 2008 General election.
2010 Luke won the September 18, 2010 Democratic Primary with 4,688 votes (75.7%), and won the November 2, 2010 General election with 6,189 votes (69.5%) against Republican nominee Norm Katz.
2012 Redistricted to District 25, and with Democratic Representative Della Au Belatti redistricted to District 24, Luke was unopposed for both the August 11, 2012 Democratic Primary, winning with 4,319 votes, and the November 6, 2012 General election.
2022 Luke won the 13 August 2022 Hawaii Lieutenant Governor Democratic Primary, race called by The Associated Press.

See also 
 List of minority governors and lieutenant governors in the United States

References

External links
 
 
 

|-

|-

|-

 

 

1967 births
21st-century American politicians
21st-century American women politicians
American women lawyers
American women of Korean descent in politics
Hawaii lawyers
Lieutenant Governors of Hawaii
Living people
Democratic Party members of the Hawaii House of Representatives
People from Seoul
Politicians from Honolulu
University of Hawaiʻi at Mānoa alumni
University of San Francisco School of Law alumni
Women state legislators in Hawaii